Tine Stange (born 14 May 1986) is a Norwegian handball player. She currently plays for Larvik HK.

She made her debut on the Norwegian national team on 21 June 2007, and played 50 games for the national team between 2007 and 2016. Her international achievements include a silver medal at the 2009 World Women's Handball Championship, and a gold medal at the 2010 European Women's Handball Championship.

Achievements
World Championship:
Bronze Medalist: 2009
European Championship:
Winner: 2010
EHF Champions League:
Winner: 2010/2011
Finalist: 2012/2013, 2014/2015
EHF Cup Winners' Cup
Winner: 2004/2005, 2007/2008
Finalist: 2008/2009
Norwegian League:
Winner: 2004/2005, 2005/2006, 2006/2007, 2008/2009, 2009/2010, 2010/2011, 2011/2012, 2012/2013, 2013/2014, 2014/2015, 2015/2016
Norwegian Cup:
Winner: 2004, 2005, 2006, 2008, 2009, 2010, 2011, 2012, 2013, 2014, 2015

References

External links

Norwegian female handball players
1986 births
Living people
Sportspeople from Tønsberg